The Ministry of Culture (Czech language: Ministerstvo kultury České republiky) of the Czech Republic was established in 1969.

See also
Ministry of Culture

External links
 

Czech Republic
Czech Republic
Culture
Ministry of Culture
Ministries established in 1969
1969 establishments in Czechoslovakia